was a prominent right-wing Japanese politician and Prime Minister of Japan in 1939. He was convicted of war crimes committed during World War II and was sentenced to life imprisonment.

Early life 
Hiranuma was born in what is now Tsuyama City, Okayama Prefecture, as the son of a low-ranking samurai from the Tsuyama Domain of Mimasaka Province. He graduated with a degree in English law from Tokyo Imperial University in 1888. After graduation, he obtained a posting in the Ministry of Justice. In 1911, he was the prosecutor for the High Treason Incident, the 1910 socialist-anarchist plot to assassinate Japanese Emperor Meiji. The closed-court trial of 25 men and 1 woman, including 4 Buddhist monks, resulted in the execution of 12, including the feminist author Kanno Suga.

Ministry of Justice 
Hiranuma established a reputation during his time at the Ministry of Justice as a strong opponent of government corruption and successfully handled a number of high-profile cases. He served as the director of the Tokyo High Court, public prosecutor of the Supreme Court, and Director of the Civil and Criminal Affairs Bureau. In 1909, he secured the conviction of 25 former and serving members of the Diet of Japan for accepting bribes from the Japan Sugar Company. He rose to become Vice Minister of Justice in 1911 and Public Prosecutor-general in 1912.

In 1915, he forced Home Minister Ōura Kanetake in the cabinet of Prime Minister Ōkuma Shigenobu to resign for suspected bribery.

Hiranuma was highly outspoken against the corruption and immorality in Japan's political parties, and that attitude soon expanded to include what he perceived to be threatening foreign influences, such as socialism and liberal democracy.

With Sadao Araki, Hiranuma created the Kokuhonsha group and participated in other nationalist groups.

In 1921, Hiranuma became chief of the Supreme Court of Japan.

Hiranuma was Minister of Justice under the second Yamamoto administration from September 1923 to January 1924. In that capacity, he promoted the creation of the Tokkō to combat communism, socialism, and the spread of what he considered subversive ideologies. In 1924, he became chairman of the House of Peers and was also appointed to the Privy Council. In 1926, he was elevated to the title of danshaku (baron) under the kazoku peerage system.

Privy Councilor 

Hiranuma served on the Privy Council for over 10 years and exerted considerable behind-the-scenes influence. He was strongly opposed to Prime Minister Wakatsuki Reijirō's efforts at economic reform. He was also strongly opposed to the ratification of the London Naval Treaty of 1930. In 1931, he rallied support within the government for the Imperial Japanese Army after the army had seized control of Manchuria without prior authorization, and he later helped in the creation of Manchukuo. He also pushed for Japan's withdrawal from the League of Nations. According to one theory, he in 1934 he directed the prosecution during the Teijin Incident.

In 1936, Hiranuma was appointed as President of the Privy Council.

Prime minister 

Japanese Prime Minister Kiichirō Hiranuma (1867–1952, in office January–August 1939, center, front row) and the members of his cabinet, on the inaugural day of his administration.

Hiranuma was  Prime Minister of Japan from 5 January 1939 to 30 August 1939. As Prime Minister, his administration was dominated by the debate on whether or not Japan should ally itself with Germany against the  Soviet Union. Hiranuma wanted an anticommunist pact but feared that a military alliance would commit Japan to war against the United States and the United Kingdom when most of its armed forces were committed to the Second Sino-Japanese War. With the signing of the German-Soviet Non-Aggression Pact in August 1939, Hiranuma's cabinet resigned over that foreign policy issue and over the massive defeat of the Japanese Army in Mongolia during the Nomonhan Incident against the Soviet Union.

Home Minister 
Hiranuma returned to the government after his resignation as Prime Minister by being Home Minister in the second Konoe Fumimaro administration from 21 December 1940 to 18 July 1941.

As Home Minister, he was a staunch defender of State Shinto. Hiranuma declared: "We should research the ancient rites in detail and consider their application in administrative affairs in general and the common life of the nation."

However, Hiranuma was strongly opposed to the political and diplomatic actions of Foreign Minister Yōsuke Matsuoka and to the Tripartite Pact between Imperial Japan, Nazi Germany, and Fascist Italy in 1940.

He withdrew from the government on the resignation of Konoe in October 1941.

Jushin
Hiranuma served as one of the jushin (重臣), or unofficial senior advisors, to Hirohito during World War II. Hiranuma saw the jushin as the core of a new group of genrō advisors, as the last surviving Meiji period genrō, Prince Saionji Kinmochi, had died in November 1940. The new group included former Prime Ministers Mitsumasa Yonai, Nobuyuki Abe and Fumimaro Konoe, all of whom supported Japan's aggressive foreign policy and the right-socialist ideals of Kingoro Hashimoto on the creation of a Military Shogunate to manage Imperial affairs directly. In April 1945, Hiranuma was again appointed as President of the Privy Council.

Prosecution and conviction
After the war, he was arrested by the American Occupation Authorities and was convicted by the International Military Tribunal for the Far East as a Class A War Criminal. He was given a life sentence, but he was paroled in early 1952, and died shortly afterwards. His grave is at Tama Cemetery, outside Tokyo.

References 
 Bix, Herbert P. Hirohito and the Making of Modern Japan. Harper Perennial (2001). 
 Brendon, Piers. The Dark Valley: A Panorama of the 1930s. Vintage; Reprint edition (2002). 
 Frank, Richard B. Downfall: The End of the Imperial Japanese Empire. Penguin (Non-Classics); Reissue edition (2001). 
 Sherman, Christine. War Crimes: International Military Tribunal. Turner Publishing Company. (2001). 
 Wolferen, Karel van. The Enigma of Japanese Power: People and Politics in a Stateless Nation. Vintage; Reprint edition (1990).

External links
 

|-

1867 births
1952 deaths
20th-century prime ministers of Japan
People from Okayama Prefecture
University of Tokyo alumni
Japanese prosecutors
Kazoku
Japanese Shintoists
Prime Ministers of Japan
Members of the House of Peers (Japan)
Japanese people of World War II
Japanese people convicted of the international crime of aggression
People convicted by the International Military Tribunal for the Far East
Japanese prisoners sentenced to life imprisonment
Prisoners sentenced to life imprisonment by international courts and tribunals
Japanese people convicted of war crimes
People paroled from life sentence
Japanese politicians convicted of crimes
Heads of government convicted of war crimes
Heads of government who were later imprisoned
Politicians from Okayama Prefecture
Prosecutors General of Japan